Yevgeny Sinyayev (2 January 1948 – 11 August 2006) was a Soviet sprinter. He competed in the men's 100 metres at the 1968 Summer Olympics.

References

1948 births
2006 deaths
Athletes (track and field) at the 1968 Summer Olympics
Soviet male sprinters
Olympic athletes of the Soviet Union
Place of birth missing